State Route 173 (SR 173) is a short  state highway that runs south–north through Meriwether County, in the west-central part of the U.S. state of Georgia. The route is mostly straight except near its northern terminus.

Route description
SR 173 begins at an intersection with SR 41 in the extreme northwestern corner of Manchester. It heads due north and curves to the northwest until it meets its northern terminus, an intersection with SR 85 Alternate in the unincorporated community of Raleigh.

Major intersections

See also

References

External links

 Georgia Roads (Routes 161 - 180)

173
Transportation in Meriwether County, Georgia